Robert Blakey may refer to:

 G. Robert Blakey (born 1936), American attorney and law professor
 Robert Blakey (writer) (1795–1878), English writer and academic, a Chartist radical and journalist